"All I Want" is a song by Skunk Anansie, released as the first single from their second album, Stoosh. It was released in September 1996 and reached number 14 on the UK Singles Chart.

Music video
The music video was directed by Stephen Norrington.

Track listing

CD single – CD1

CD single – CD2

Charts

References

1996 singles
1996 songs
Skunk Anansie songs
Songs written by Skin (musician)
Song recordings produced by Garth Richardson
One Little Indian Records singles